The Chhimtuipui river, also known as the Chhimmtuipi Lui or Kaladan river, is a river of Mizoram, northeastern India. It flows in a southerly direction through Myanmar.

Geography
The river is the biggest river in Mizoram by volume. It enters Mizoram near Sabawngte village from where it flows Northward for  till it meets Tiau river. From this point it flows northwest and meets Tuichawng river near Hnahthial and flows southwards where Mat river and Mengpui River meet.

Hydro-electric project
The government of India is planning to construct a dam and hydro-electric project.

Kaladan river route
This river is also part of the Kaladan Multi-Modal Transit Transport Project.

See also
 Lungleng River
 East-West Industrial Corridor Highway, Arunachal Pradesh
 Arunachal Border Highway
 Asian Highway Network
 India-Myanmar-Thailand Friendship Highway

References

Rivers of Mizoram
Rivers of India